Cuban Fireball is a 1951 American musical film directed by William Beaudine and starring Estelita Rodriguez, Warren Douglas and Mimi Aguglia. An employee at a Havana cigar factory discovers that she has been left some lucrative oil wells by a relative. She travels to Los Angeles to claim her inheritance.

Plot

Cast
 Estelita Rodriguez as Estelita 
 Warren Douglas as Tommy Pomeroy 
 Mimi Aguglia as Señora Martinez 
 Leon Belasco as Hunyabi 
 Donald MacBride as Captain Brown 
 Rosa Turich as Maria 
 John Litel as Pomeroy Sr. 
 Tim Ryan as Detective Bacon 
 Russ Vincent as Ramon 
 Edward Gargan as Ritter 
 Victoria Horne as The Maid 
 Jack Kruschen as Lefty 
 Pedro de Cordoba as Don Perez 
 Olan Soule as Jimmy 
 Tony Barr as Estaban Martinez 
 Luther Crockett as Rafferty

References

Bibliography
 Gevinson, Alan. Within Our Gates: Ethnicity in American Feature Films, 1911-1960. University of California Press, 1997.

External links

1951 films
American musical comedy films
American black-and-white films
1951 musical comedy films
1950s English-language films
Films directed by William Beaudine
Republic Pictures films
Films set in Los Angeles
Films set in Havana
Films with screenplays by Jack Townley
1950s American films